Fabiola Paoletti (born 1 June 1966) is a former Italian female long-distance runner who competed at individual senior level at the IAAF World Women's Road Race Championships.

Biography
Paoletti won Rome Marathon in 1988. She finished 5th at the 1991 Summer Universiade – Women's marathon held in Sheffield.

References

External links
 
 Fabiola Paoletti at Elencogiornalisti.it 

1966 births
Living people
Italian female long-distance runners